Matice Wright-Springer (born 1965)  was the first African-American female naval flight officer.

Life
Wright was born and grew up in Annapolis, Maryland. She attended Annapolis High School in her hometown. She received a bachelor's degree in the physical sciences from the United States Naval Academy. After leaving active duty, Wright obtained a master's degree in business administration from Johns Hopkins University. She went on to obtain a master's degree in public administration from Harvard University's Kennedy School of Government.

Career
Wright graduated from the United States Naval Academy in 1988. In 1989, she became the United States Navy's first African-American female flight officer. Wright went on to serve on active duty for eight years. After leaving active duty, she worked in the private sector. In 1997, Wright was appointed a White House Fellow in the United States Treasury Department. She also worked to manage Sikorsky Aircraft international military helicopter programs. She went on to become the principal director for industrial policy at the United States Department of Defense. In fall 2016, former president Barack Obama appointed her to the United States Naval Academy Board of Visitors where she currently serves. She is also now a vice president at ManTech International. In March 2021, Matice became a senior vice president at Booz Allen Hamilton.

References

Living people
1965 births
Harvard Kennedy School alumni
African-American female military personnel
United States Naval Academy alumni
Aviators from Maryland
African-American women aviators
American women aviators
African-American aviators
Women United States Naval Aviators
21st-century African-American people
21st-century African-American women
20th-century African-American people
20th-century African-American women
African-American United States Navy personnel